Einstein on the Run: How Britain Saved the World's Greatest Scientist (2019), by Andrew Robinson, is a biographical account of Albert Einstein's half-century relationship with Britain's science, scientists, and society, focusing on his escape from Nazi Germany via Britain in 1933.

The book includes a prologue, eight chapters an epilogue, notes and references, a bibliography, and an index, with 33 monochrome illustrations. It is available in hardback and paperback versions. An audible version is available, narrated by Antony Ferguson. Einstein's visits to the University of Oxford at the invitation of the Oxford physicist Frederick Lindemann (1st Viscount Cherwell), staying in Christ Church,  and his 1931 lectures at Rhodes House in Oxford, including his preserved blackboard, are also covered.

The book has been reviewed in a number of publications and online, including:

 Amazon
 BBC Sky at Night
 Metascience
 Nature
 Physics World
 The Times Literary Supplement
 The Wall Street Journal

An associated event took place on 8 March 2020 at Kings Place in London as part of Jewish Book Week 2020, featuring the book's author Andrew Robinson and the astrophysicist Martin Rees. The event was recorded.

See also
 Einstein's Blackboard at the History of Science Museum, Oxford

References

External links
 Einstein On the Run: How Britain Saved the World’s Greatest Scientist talk by Andrew Robinson at the Wigtown Book Festival

2019 non-fiction books
21st-century history books
Yale University Press books
Books about Albert Einstein
History books about Nazi Germany